The R422 road  is a regional road in Ireland, which runs west-east from the R421 north of the Slieve Bloom Mountains to the R445 at New Inn, County Laois.

See also
Roads in Ireland
National primary road
National secondary road

References
Roads Act 1993 (Classification of Regional Roads) Order 2006 – Department of Transport

Regional roads in the Republic of Ireland
Roads in County Laois